
Gmina Krośnice is a rural gmina (administrative district) in Milicz County, Lower Silesian Voivodeship, in south-western Poland. It is part of the Wrocław metropolitan area.

Neighbouring gminas
Gmina Krośnice is bordered by the gminas of Dobroszyce, Milicz, Sośnie, Twardogóra and Zawonia.

Villages
The gmina contains the villages of Brzostówko, Brzostowo, Bukowice, Czarnogoździce, Czeszyce, Dąbrowa, Dziewiętlin, Grabownica, Kotlarka, Krośnice, Kubryk, Kuźnica Czeszycka, Łazy Małe, Łazy Wielkie, Łazy-Poręba, Lędzina, Luboradów, Pierstnica, Pierstnica Mała, Police, Stara Huta, Suliradzice, Świebodów, Wąbnice, Wierzchowice and Żeleźniki.

References

Krosnice
Milicz County